The J Award of 2014 is the tenth annual J Awards, established by the Australian Broadcasting Corporation's youth-focused radio station Triple J. The announcement comes at the culmination of Ausmusic Month (November). For the first time, the award for Double J Artist of the Year was announced. It was added to the three previous awards; Australian Album of the Year, Australian Music Video of the Year and Unearthed Artist of the Year.

The eligible period took place between November 2013 and October 2014. The winners were announced live on air on Triple J on Tuesday 18 November 2014.

Awards

Australian Album of the Year

Double J Artist of the Year

Australian Video of the Year

Unearthed Artist of the Year

References

2014 in Australian music
2014 music awards
J Awards